Janusz Jan Niemojewski (1531–1598) was a Polish nobleman, and theologian of the Polish Brethren.

Works
 1583 – "Odpowiedź na potwarz Wilkowskiego"
 1583 – "Obrona przeciw niesprawiedliwemu obwinieniu".
 1584 – "Ukazanie iż kościół rzymski papieski nie jest apostolski..."
 1611 – Fausto Sozzini, "Scripta theologica seu tractatus breves de diversis materiis", Raków 1611, pp. 94–293.

References

1531 births
1598 deaths
Polish Unitarians